Events from the year 1603 in France

Incumbents
 Monarch – Henry IV

Events

Births

Full date missing
Marie-Madeleine de Chauvigny de la Peltrie (died 1671)
Zeno de Beauge, missionary (died 1687)
Valentin Conrart, writer (died 1675)
Michel Le Tellier, statesman (died 1685)

Deaths

Full date missing
Pierre Charron, Catholic theologian and philosopher (born 1541)
Pierre de Chauvin de Tonnetuit, military officer
Étienne Dumonstier, painter (born 1540)
Aymar Chaste, admiral (born 1514)

See also

References

1600s in France